Turkey participated in the 2009 Mediterranean Games held in Pescara, Italy from 25 June to 5 July 2009.

Competitors
Reference

Medal summary

Medal table

Medalists

Results by event

Canoeing Flat
Men

Women

Golf
Men

Women

Gymnastics

Artistic

Men

Women

Karate

Women's kumite

Water skiing
Women

Weightlifting

References

Nations at the 2009 Mediterranean Games
2009
Mediterranean Games